Michael Mosley (born 22 March 1957) is a British television journalist, producer, presenter, and former doctor who has worked for the BBC since 1985. He is probably best known as a presenter of television programmes on biology and medicine and his regular appearances on The One Show. Mosley is an intermittent fasting and low-carbohydrate diet advocate who has written books promoting the ketogenic diet.

Early life
Mosley was born in Calcutta, India. His father was a banker and his maternal grandfather was a bishop. Mosley attended a boarding school in England from the age of seven. He studied Philosophy, Politics and Economics at New College, Oxford, before working for two years as a banker in the City of London. He then decided to move into medicine, intending to become a psychiatrist, studying at the Royal Free Hospital Medical School, now part of UCL Medical School. He is no longer a registered doctor.

Career
Upon graduation from medical school, and having become disillusioned by psychiatry, Mosley joined a trainee assistant producer scheme at the BBC in 1985.

He produced a number of science programmes, including The Human Face, three series with Professor Robert Winston, and the 2004 BBC Two engineering series Inventions That Changed the World hosted by Jeremy Clarkson. He presented Blood and Guts, Medical Mavericks and The Story of Science for television, and was the subject of a television documentary, 10 Things You Need to Know about Losing Weight. He presented Make Me for BBC One. In April–June 2010 he produced and presented the television series The Story of Science: Power, Proof and Passion broadcast by BBC Two.

In 2011 he made a series entitled The Brain: A Secret History, on the history of psychology and neuroscience. During the series, while describing the methods that are being employed to identify the anomalies in brain structure associated with psychopathy, his personal test results revealed he himself had these candidate brain characteristics. In the same year, he made a two-part documentary, Frontline Medicine with episodes called "Survival" and "Rebuilding Lives".  These programmes described the medical advances in the treatment of military personnel during the 10 years of war in Iraq and Afghanistan and examined how these new techniques are being used in emergency medicine in civilian casualties in the United States and Great Britain.

His documentary The Truth About Exercise, shown first in 2012, aired current thinking about how different patterns of exercise might help achieve health benefits, the danger of sitting for prolonged periods and revealed how certain genotypes are unable to gain significant improvements in aerobic fitness (VO2 max) by following endurance exercise programmes.  His own genetic type can gain many of the benefits of exercise, primarily improved insulin response, through short, high-intensity training sessions as suggested by the research of Professor James Timmons.

In January 2013, he presented The Genius of Invention. In the documentary named The Truth About Personality, first aired on 10 July 2013, Mosley explores what science can tell us about optimism and pessimism and whether we can change our outlook.

Mosley, along with a group of medical specialists, presented a documentary series titled The Diagnostic Detectives which aired in 2020. In the series, each programme is centred around the group of doctors who choose to tackle a patient's problem.

In 2021, Mosley presented a three-part series, Lose a Stone in 21 Days for Channel 4. On the programme Mosley asserted that people can lose a stone in 21 days by consuming only 800 calories a day. This advice is considered dangerous by medical experts and the programme received a backlash on social media platforms. Beat, the UK's leading charity supporting those affected by eating disorders stated that "the programme caused enough stress and anxiety to our beneficiaries that we extended our Helpline hours to support anyone affected and received 51% more contact during that time".

Low-carbohydrate diet advocacy

Mosley is a low-carbohydrate advocate who promotes intermittent fasting. He is credited with popularising the 5:2 diet, based on his close friend Valter Longo's research. In August 2012, he appeared on the BBC2 Horizon documentary Eat, Fast & Live Longer. In early 2013 he published The Fast Diet with Mimi Spencer.

Recently, Mosley advocates The Fast 800 Diet, a low-carb Mediterranean diet with intermittent fasting that follows a daily 800-calorie eating plan. His book The Fast 800 Keto combines a ketogenic diet with intermittent fasting.

Television

Awards and honours

In 1994, Ulcer Wars, his 16 May 1994 Horizon documentary, reported the link between Helicobacter pylori and gastric ulcers, discovered by Australian scientists  Robin Warren and Barry Marshall.  He was named Medical Journalist of the Year in 1995 by the British Medical Association. In 1996, the programme was noted as one of the most important factors to influence  British general practitioners' prescribing habits.

In 2002, Mosley was nominated for an Emmy as an Executive Producer for The Human Face with John Cleese.

Personal life
Mosley is married to Clare Bailey, a GP; they have four children. He has reversed his Type 2 diabetes with diet and exercise. In a BBC documentary on sleep, Mosley revealed he has chronic insomnia. He published Fast Asleep in 2019.

Selected publications

References

External links
 
 Profile at JLA agency
 Michael Mosley on the Eden channel website
 Michael Mosley - BBC One Show

Living people
Alumni of University College London
Alumni of the UCL Medical School
1957 births
21st-century British medical doctors
Alumni of New College, Oxford
British television presenters
British television producers
Fasting advocates
Horizon (British TV series)
Low-carbohydrate diet advocates
People from Beaconsfield
Scientists from Kolkata
Science communicators
Science education in the United Kingdom